Endorama is the ninth studio album by German thrash metal band Kreator, released on 20 April, 1999 by Drakkar Records. The gothic metal influences were the most prominent on this release, and Lacrimosa frontman Tilo Wolff provided guest vocals on the title song. 

This is the final Kreator album to feature Tommy Vetterli, who was replaced by current guitarist Sami Yli-Sirniö shortly before the recording of their next album Violent Revolution.

Track listing
All music by Mille Petrozza and Tommy Vetterli, except tracks 6, 8, 9, 11, 12, 13 by Mille Petrozza. All lyrics by Petrozza

Personnel
Kreator
Mille Petrozza – vocals, rhythm guitar, producer, cover art, concept, design
Tommy Vetterli – lead guitar, guitar synth, programming, producer
Christian Giesler – bass
Jürgen Reil – drums

Additional musicians
Tilo Wolff – guest vocals on track 2
Christian Wolf – orchestral arrangements on tracks 5 and 8

Production
Detti Mohrmann, Jörg Sahm, Kalle Trapp – pre-production engineers at KKS Studios, Essen and at Mohrmann Studios, Bochum, Germany.
Britta Kühlmann, Gudrun Laos, Jörg Steinfadt – engineers
Roland Kupferschmied – engineer, additional programming
Dawo – assistant engineer
Gudrun Laos – vocal coach and producer
Ronald Prent – mixing at Wisseloord Studios, Hilversum, Netherlands
Hendrik Ostrak – mixing assistant
Rene Schardt – mastering
Peter Dell – design, concept, cover art
Markus Mayer – artwork, cover art

Charts

References

External links
 Kreator Terrorzone: Endorama

Kreator albums
1999 albums
Gothic metal albums by German artists
Drakkar Entertainment albums